Konrad Kwiecień (born 2 March 1964) is a Polish archer. He competed in the men's individual and team events at the 1992 Summer Olympics.

References

1964 births
Living people
Polish male archers
Olympic archers of Poland
Archers at the 1992 Summer Olympics
Sportspeople from Kielce